John S. W. Eagles was a state legislator in North Carolina. He served in the North Carolina House of Representatives in 1869 ti 1870. He represented New Hanover County and was African American. He lived in Wilmington.

Biography 

Eagles was born around 1843/4 in North Carolina.

He served in the American Civil War as a first sergeant in the 37th United States Colored Troops (U.S.C.T.) He was wounded at the Battle of the Crater by a bayonet.

He helped establish the Republican Party in New Hanover County and served as a police sergeant, registrar and election judge. His son Dr. John Eagles graduated from the Leonard School of Pharmacy at Shaw University in Raleigh and established a drugstore.

Eagles served in the North Carolina House of Representatives after replacing representative Gen. L .G. Estes who resigned and served from 1869 until 1870. 
In 1870 he stood again as an independent candidate for a seat in the house but did not win.

In 1884, Eagles was quoted telling fellow veterans "Why are over 50,000 colored soldiers laying beneath the sod today? Why are their bones bleaching in the dust tonight? For the privileges we are enjoying today. Civil rights, political rights, soldiers’ and sailors’ rights, and religious rights; and we propose to protect those rights, let come what will or may.”

He was appointed as an enumerator for Wilmington for the 1890 United States census.

Eagles died July 1901.

See also
 African-American officeholders during and following the Reconstruction era

References

1840s births
1901 deaths
Members of the North Carolina House of Representatives
African-American police officers